Scottish and Southern Electricity Networks (the trading name of Scottish and Southern Energy Power Distribution Limited, Scottish Hydro Electric Transmission plc, Scottish Hydro Electric Power Distribution plc and Southern Electric Power Distribution plc) is one of two energy companies in the UK to be involved both in electricity transmission and distribution. 

The company forms part of the SSE plc group, which is listed on the London Stock Exchange and is a constituent of the FTSE 100 Index. 

Scottish and Southern Electricity Networks manages two distribution networks and one transmission network. The company manages two of the fourteen distribution licenses in Great Britain. The company's electricity distribution and transmission networks carry electricity to over 3.7 million homes and businesses across the north of the Central Belt of Scotland, as well as Central Southern England. The company operates in the United Kingdom with head offices in Perth, Scotland and Reading, England.

History

Origins 
The company has its origins in two public sector electricity supply authorities. Scottish Hydroelectric, founded as the North of Scotland Hydro-Electric Board in 1943, was established to design, construct and manage hydroelectricity projects in the Highlands of Scotland, and took over a further generation and distribution responsibilities when the UK's electricity industry was nationalized in 1948. Southern Electric, founded as Southern Electricity Board in 1948, was created to distribute electricity in Southern England. While the Southern Electricity Board was a distribution-only authority with no power generation capacity of its own, the North of Scotland Hydro-Electric Board was a broader spectrum organisation which did have power-generating capabilities. Because of its history and location, the Hydroelectric Board was responsible for most of the UK's hydroelectric generating capacity.

Both authorities were privatized and re-branded in 1990/91, initially retaining their pre-privatization geographic and functional bases.

Post-privatization 
In 1998, Scottish and Southern Energy was formed following a merger between Scottish Hydroelectric and Southern Electric. This part of the SSE plc group is now referred to as Scottish and Southern Electricity Networks.

Rebranding 

In September 2016, the well-known trading names of Scottish and Southern Energy Power Distribution (SSEPD), Scottish Hydro Electric Power Distribution (SHEPD), Scottish Hydro Electric Transmission (SHET), and Southern Electric Power Distribution (SEPD), merged into a single trading entity known as the Scottish and Southern Electricity Networks. The licensee names of the four did not change.

As part of the rebranding, Scottish and Southern Electricity Networks changed their logo, color scheme, imagery set, social media channels, and website. They also introduced a new company motto centred around being a part of the community they serve: "Powering our Community."

Partnerships 
In November 2022, SSE sold a 25% stake in SSEN Transmission (the trading name for Scottish Hydro Electric Transmission) to Ontario Teachers' Pension Plan.

Operations 
Scottish and Southern Electricity Networks operate the economically regulated electricity distribution and transmission networks across the north of the Central Belt of Scotland and also Central Southern England, delivering power to 3.7 million homes. With a work force of over 4,000 working from 85 depots and offices, they look after a network that consists of:

 130,000 km of overhead lines and underground cables
 106,000 substations
 Over 100 subsea cables, powering island communities such as Orkney and Hebrides.

Scottish and Southern Electricity Networks—Central Southern England 
The Central Southern England network is the larger of two distribution networks and delivers electrical supplies to over 12.9 million customers across central southern England. The operational region ranges from rural communities in Hampshire, Dorset, Wiltshire, Gloucestershire and Oxfordshire to towns and cities including Bournemouth, Oxford, Portsmouth, Reading, Southampton, Slough, Swindon and in parts of West London. They also distribute electricity to and across the Isle of Wight.

Scottish and Southern Electricity Networks—Northern Scotland 
The Northern Scotland network is the smaller of the two, and delivers electricity to some 740,000 customers. This operating region covers a quarter of the UK landmass, and has challenges both regarding distance and location. As well as the major towns and cities of Aberdeen, Dundee, Inverness and Perth, they connect to most Scottish islands with over 100 subsea cable links, including the Inner and Outer Hebrides, Arran and the Orkney Islands. They also serve the Shetland Islands, which runs as a separate electrical system without a connection to the mainland.

Scottish Hydro Electric Transmission (SHE Transmission) 
Scottish Hydro Electric Transmission owns and maintains the 132 kV and 275 kV electricity transmission network in the north of Scotland, in some of the UK's most challenging geographical terrains. Some of their circuits are situated over 750 meters above sea level and or up to 250 km long. The operating area contains a vast renewable energy resource, utilized in forms such as wind and marine generation. These generators are all dependent on SHE Transmission for transportation to the load centers to the south.

Independent distribution network operator 
In addition to the distribution network operators who are licensed for a specific geographic area, there are also independent distribution network operators (IDNOs). IDNOs own and operate electricity distribution networks, which are predominantly network extensions connected to an existing distribution network. Scottish and Southern Electricity Networks also provides distribution services in South Scotland as an IDNO and in all other English and Welsh areas.

Services 
Scottish and Southern Electricity Networks provides a number of services across its distribution areas.

In the event of a power outage, it is the responsibility of Scottish and Southern Electricity Networks to repair the fault and get power back on for affected areas. Scottish and Southern Electricity Networks also has a Priority Services Register to support customers with disabilities or particular vulnerabilities in the event of a power outage.

Scottish and Southern Electricity Networks has a team dedicated to dealing with non-emergency electricity network jobs in central southern England and northern Scotland. These services range from shrouding overhead power cables to locating underground electricity cables so that those cables can be worked around safely.

A spokesperson for the Energy Networks Association said “The charges for connection applications have been introduced following a recent government consultation, which found that the majority of industry supported the change."

Economically-regulated businesses 
Scottish and Southern Electricity Networks transmits and distributes electricity to around 3.7 million businesses, offices, and homes through some 130,000 kilometres of overhead lines and underground cables.

Scottish and Southern Electricity Networks are regulated by the Office of Gas and Electricity Markets (Ofgem).

SSE transmit the Electricity via their poles that are usually situated on private land, not belonging to SSE.  In this instance SSE must use a legal process called 'Wayleave' to access the property. The land owners have the ultimate right to refuse wayleave, or charge them a reasonable rate for the usage of the land.

Currently SSE offer £8.77 a year for a pole on NFU land, although private land owners with no easement on deeds have the option to legally refuse this and have SSE remove their equipment.

Controversy 
 In 2013 SSE were found guilty of misleading customers and fined a record (at the time) £10.5M by Ofgem.
 Shortly after this, Head of SSE at the time Ian Marchant, on an £840,000 salary, left the company with a £400,000 pension plan.
 In 2020 SSE were fined £2m by Ofgem over inside information in the energy markets.
 In 2021 SSE are pressing ahead with the UKs largest offshore windfarm in Shetland, despite heavy local opposition.

See also 
 SSE plc
 Office of Gas and Electricity Markets (Ofgem)

References

External links 
 Scottish and Southern Electricity Networks
 Scottish and Southern Electricity Networks – Transmission
 SSE plc

Electric power companies of Scotland
Electric power transmission system operators in the United Kingdom